Acropoma leobergi is a species of the genus Acropoma described as having a luminous behind the anus that resembles a "U" in shape. The species is native to the Arafura Sea.

References 

leobergi
Fish described in 2018